Epoxiconazole is a fungicide active ingredient from the class of azoles developed to protect crops. In particular, the substance inhibits the metabolism of fungi cells infesting useful plants, and thereby prevents the growth of the mycelia (fungal cells). Epoxiconazole also limits the production of conidia (mitospores). Epoxiconazole was introduced to the market by BASF SE in 1993 and can be found in many products and product mixtures targeting a large number of pathogens in various crops. Crops are, for example, cereals (mainly wheat, barley, rye and triticale), soybeans, banana, rice, coffee, turnips, and red as well as sugar beets.

Use
World food supply is projected to face additional stress in the future; within the next decade cereal demands in Europe alone are expected to increase by 21%, while production is projected to increase by only 7%. At the same time, two main cereal diseases, leaf blotch (Septoria tritici) and rust (Puccinia triticina), are responsible for up to 30% yield losses. Failure to adequately control these diseases would affect both food availability and food quality. Although not used commercially for insect control, epoxiconazole exhibits a strong anti-feeding effect on the keratin-digesting common clothes moth larvae Tineola bisselliella.

Resistance
Certain plant pathogens develop resistance to fungicides. In contrast to the relatively rapid development of resistance to strobilurins, azole fungicides like Epoxiconazole have maintained their effectiveness controlling key wheat diseases for over two decades. According to a study conducted by the Home Grown Cereals Authority (HGCA), Epoxiconazole was one of two triazole fungicides (the other being prothioconazole) reported to still provide a high level of eradicative and protective control of Septoria tritici. Additional classes of fungicides like contact fungicides, strobilurins or carboxamides are available to farmers. In the latter case, the best activity rates are achieved in mixtures with triazoles.

Mode of Action
As an azole, Epoxiconazole, actively stops the production of new fungi spores and inhibits the biosynthesis of existing hostile cells. Epoxiconazole works as an eradicant by encapsulating fungal haustoria, which are then cut off from their nutrient supply and therefore die. Some fungicide interactions can actually lead to increased production of mycotoxins, which are normal metabolic products of fungi, and it has been found that the inclusion of triazoles, like Epoxiconazole, in the fungicide mix may be necessary to limit mycotoxin levels.

Regulation
The EU’s pesticide directive (91/414 EEC) currently lists Epoxiconazole in Annex I. Only active ingredients listed there may be used in plant protection products and sold to farmers. Substances can only be listed in Annex I if extensive data regarding the physical chemical properties, the fate and behaviour in the environment and certain toxicological properties have been evaluated by EU authorities and EFSA. Only if a substance has been proven to be safe for users, consumers and the environment when used according to instructions it is included. Annex I listings are granted for ten years. Epoxiconazole’s listing expires on 30 April 2019; European farmers can use products containing Epoxiconazole, depending on their national registration, at least until the date of expiration for Annex I listing.

References

Fungicides